Jamie Macpherson (1675–1700) also known as James Macpherson was a Scottish outlaw, famed for his poetic work commonly called "Macpherson's Lament" said to have been composed by him on the eve of his execution. "Macpherson's Lament" is known also as "Macpherson's Rant" or "Macpherson's Farewell".

Early life
Macpherson was born in 1675, the illegitimate son of the Macpherson family of Invernesshire, to a Highland laird and a tinker or gypsy woman that he had met at a wedding. Macpherson's father acknowledged the child as his and raised him in his house. The father died while attempting to a recover cattle which were taken by reivers from Badenoch. Following the father's death, the child was taken in by the mother's Gypsy (Romani) community. Macpherson and his mother would often visit together the boy's relations and clansmen, who clothed him and provided money to the mother. It is reported that Macpherson was of uncommon strength and he had become an expert swordsman, as well as a musician capable of using the fiddle.

Outlaw career
Though his prowess was debased as the exploits of a robber, it is certain, says one writer, that no act of cruelty, or robbery of the widow, the fatherless, or the distressed was ever perpetrated under his command.  Indeed, it is alleged that a dispute with an aspiring and savage man of his tribe, who wished to rob a gentleman's house while his wife and two children lay on the bier for interment, was the cause of his being betrayed to the vengeance of the law. Thus he was betrayed by a man of his own tribe, and was the last person executed at Banff previous to the abolition of heritable jurisdictions.

Macpherson had incurred the enmity of the rich lairds and farmers of the low country of Banff and Aberdeenshire, and especially Duff of Braco, who organised a posse to capture him.  "After holding the counties of Aberdeen, Banff, and Moray in fear for some years", says Chambers, "he was seized by Duff of Braco, ancestor of the Earl of Fife, and tried before the Sheriff of Banffshire (8 November 1700), along with certain Gypsies who had been taken in his company.

Before ultimately being brought to trial, Macpherson was captured several times but always escaped from his enemies. In Aberdeen, his cousin, Donald, and a gypsy named Peter Brown, aided by the populace, rescued him from prison.  Shortly afterwards, he was again captured, but was once more rescued, this time by the Laird of Grant.

Capture and trial
Macpherson's career of robbery had culminated in a "reign of terror" in the markets of Banff, Elgin and Forres.  Apparently under protection of the Laird of Grant, he and his band of followers would come marching in with a piper at their head.  Perhaps he became too powerful for comfort for he was hanged at Banff in 1700, for bearing arms at Keith market.  At the Saint Rufus Fair in Keith Macpherson was attacked by Braco's men, and was captured after a fierce fight in which one of Jamie's crew was killed.  According to the traditional account penned by Jamie himself, a woman dropped a blanket over him from a window, and he was disarmed before he could get free of it.  Duff and a very strong escort then took him to Banff prison.

It was still at that time a criminal offence merely to be an Egyptian (Gypsy) in Scotland, and it was under this statute that Macpherson was tried in November 1700. Macpherson and others were brought to trial at Banff before Nicholas Dunbar, the Sheriff of Banffshire——on 8 November 1700, accused of thievery. Macpherson was sentenced to death by hanging.

Dunbar's sentence against Macpherson remained in the written record, and his death sentence was a follows:

Macpherson's Lament

While jailed before the execution of his sentence, Macpherson is said to have composed his song known today as Macpherson's Lament. According to Walter Scott, Macpherson played this tune beneath the gallows, and then, after playing his song, he offered his fiddle to his clansmen to play it at his wake. No one came forward, and so Macpherson either broke the fiddle across his knee or over the executioner's head, throwing the pieces to the crowd, saying, "No one else shall play Jamie Macpherson's fiddle". The Clan Macpherson Museum in Newtonmore houses what remains of Macpherson's fiddle.

He then was hanged or, according to some accounts, threw himself from the ladder, to hang by his own will.  This was allegedly the last capital sentence executed in Scotland under a heritable jurisdiction, taking place on 16 November 1700.

The traditional accounts of Macpherson's immense prowess seem justified by his bones, which were found not very many years ago, and were allowed by all who saw them to be much stronger than the bones of ordinary men.

It is alleged a pardon was enroute to Banff during the time of Macpherson's execution. Legendary accounts state Duff of Braco spotted a lone ride coming from Turriff and assumed the ride bore a pardon for Macpherson from the Laird of Grant. Duff is said to have changed the village's clock to be 15 minutes early to cause the death sentence to be carried out sooner, before the rider with the pardon arrived. The magistrates allegedly were punished for this and the town clock was kept 15 minutes before the correct time for many years.

References

Further reading 
 
 
 
 

17th-century Scottish people
1675 births
1700 deaths
Scottish outlaws
Scottish Travellers
Scottish poets
Scottish fiddlers
British male violinists
Scottish Romani people
Romani fiddlers
Romani criminals
People from Banffshire
People executed by the Kingdom of Scotland by hanging
Antiziganism in the United Kingdom